Edwin Barry "Ed" Young (born March 16, 1961) is the founding and senior pastor of Fellowship Church. He is a New York Times and Amazon Best-Selling author, with an  international ministry that includes the televised broadcast, Ed Young Television, C3 Global, the C3 Conference, and Fellowship Live.

Early life
Born in Canton, North Carolina, Young is the oldest son of Homer Edwin Young, senior pastor of Second Baptist Church Houston in Houston, Texas. He attended and played basketball at Florida State University in Tallahassee, Florida, where he received a basketball scholarship.  After his sophomore year, he transferred to Houston Baptist University where he received his bachelor's degree followed by a Masters of Divinity from Southwestern Baptist Theological Seminary in Fort Worth, Texas.

Early Ministry Work 

Young was called into the ministry during his sophomore year at Florida State University. He soon returned to Houston, Texas to attend Houston Baptist University and to work at his father's church as an associate pastor.

Fellowship Church
In February 1990, Young began Fellowship Church out of a rented office complex before moving to an arts center. In 1996, Fellowship Church moved into Irving's MacArthur High School to accommodate five weekend services and a weekly attendance of 5,000. Fellowship Church opened its first permanent facility on a 141-acre (0.57 sq km) property in Grapevine, Texas in 1998.

In 2003, Fellowship Church opened its first two satellite locations in Plano and Fort Worth, TX. A third satellite campus launched two years later in Dallas, TX. Between the four locations, weekly attendance was over 20,000. In May 2006, Fellowship Church opened a satellite campus in South Miami, FL; North Port Florida in 2017. In August 2018, Journey Church in Norman, OK became Fellowship Church Norman.

In 2008, Fellowship Church hosted its first summer camp and retreat center in Hawkins, TX at Allaso Ranch.

Ed Young and Fellowship Church have hosted notable guests over the years including: Troy Aikman, Tony Romo, Ryan Tannehil, Willie and Korie Robertson of Duck Dynasty,  Rev Run, Chris Kyle, Marcus Luttrell, and Oliver North.

Outreach 
When the country of Haiti was struck by an earthquake in 2010, Fellowship Church and C3 Global began proving relief and to date has provided almost 11 million meals. In partnership with C3 Global, FC hosts an annual retreat for Gold Star families with America's Mighty Warriors, with past guests Rick Perry, Glenn Beck, and Mike Huckabee. In 2016, Fellowship Church opened its first prison campus; God Behind Bars. It has since opened 2 more prison campuses. In 2017, Fellowship Church participated in relief recovery for those impacted by Hurricane Harvey.

Television 
Ed Young Television program was the first religious program of its kind to air on the E! Channel in 2010. Ed Young TV has also been seen on EdYoung.com, Roku, and Netflix.

Bibliography

References

External links
Ed Young Television

1961 births
Living people
Christian writers
Southern Baptist ministers
Baptist writers
Florida State University alumni
Houston Christian University alumni
Southwestern Baptist Theological Seminary alumni
Baptists from Texas